Wilshire/Normandie station is an underground rapid transit (known locally as a subway) station on the D Line of the Los Angeles Metro Rail system. It is located under Wilshire Boulevard at Normandie Avenue, after which the station is named, in the Mid-Wilshire and Koreatown districts of Los Angeles.

Wilshire/Normandie is one of only two D Line stations not shared with the B Line.

Service

Station layout

Hours and frequency

Connections 
, the following connections are available:

References

D Line (Los Angeles Metro) stations
Koreatown, Los Angeles
Wilshire, Los Angeles
Wilshire Boulevard
Railway stations in the United States opened in 1996
1996 establishments in California